Stovekraft is an Indian company that manufactures cooking appliances under Black+Decker, Skava, Pigeon and Gilma brands. The company was founded in 1999 and is headquartered in Bangalore, Karnataka. Among its cooking appliances are mixer grinders, pressure cookers, cooktops, toasters, chimneys and kitchen utensils. It sells its products in 23 states in India and 12 countries overseas.

History 
Stovekraft operates two manufacturing plant in India including Bangalore, Karnataka, and Baddi, Himachal Pradesh. Around 80 percent of Stovekraft's employees reportedly are women.

In 2017, Stovekraft entered a licensing agreement with American home appliances manufacturer Black+Decker to sell the latter's products in the Indian market.

In 2019, the company appointed Rajiv Mehta, the former MD of Puma, as its CEO.

The company was listed on the NSE and BSE on 5 February 2021.

References

Manufacturing companies based in Bangalore
Indian companies established in 1999
Indian brands
Cooking appliance brands
1999 establishments in Karnataka
Manufacturing companies established in 1999
Companies listed on the National Stock Exchange of India
Companies listed on the Bombay Stock Exchange